Ann Luja Cvetkovich (born 1957) is a Professor and the Director of the Pauline Jewett Institute of Women's and Gender Studies at Carleton University in Ottawa. Until 2019, she was the Ellen Clayton Garwood Centennial Professor of English and Professor of Women's and Gender Studies at the University of Texas at Austin, where she had been the founding director of the LGBTQ Studies Program, launched in 2017. She has published three books: Mixed Feelings: Feminism, Mass Culture, and Victorian Sensationalism (1992); An Archive of Feelings: Trauma, Sexuality, and Lesbian Public Cultures (2003); and Depression: A Public Feeling (2012). She has also co-edited Articulating the Global and Local: Globalization and Cultural Studies (1996) with Douglas Kellner, as well as Political Emotions: New Agendas in Communication (2010) with Janet Staiger and Ann Reynolds. Furthermore, Cvetkovich has co-edited a special issue of Scholar and Feminist Online, entitled "Public Sentiments" with Ann Pellegrini. She is also a former co-editor of GLQ: A Journal of Lesbian and Gay Studies with Annamarie Jagose.

Cvetkovich's scholarship has been widely influential within academic circles. A number of well-known scholars have drawn on her work, including Jack Halberstam, Heather Love, Sara Ahmed, Jonathan Alexander, and Deborah Gould.

In her scholarship, Cvetkovich engages with  feminist and queer theory, affect and feeling, theories of the archive, and oral history. She has also argued for the significance of looking at the everyday effects of trauma. Her interdisciplinary work explores a wide range of cultural and artistic forms, including documentary film, memoirs, music and dance performances, literature, and visual art.

Early life and education
Ann Cvetkovich was born to Joseph J. Cvetkovich and Valerie Haig-Brown, who were married at the time. Ann grew up in Canada, being raised in Vancouver and Toronto. She moved to the U.S. in 1976 in order to attend Reed College, receiving her B.A. in English and Philosophy in 1980. She then attended Cornell University, completing her Ph.D in English Literature in 1988.

Ideas and scholarship
Cvetkovich's scholarship is wide-ranging and interdisciplinary. While some of her early work is historical, dealing with Victorian literature and mass culture, most of her work engages with more contemporary cultural texts and political issues. All of her work, though, is shaped by her interest in feeling as both a subject of exploration and framework for analysis. In her article, “Histories of Mass Culture: From Literary to Visual Culture” (1999), Cvetkovich expresses her concern about her seemingly unrelated interests – her engagement with both the Victorian and the contemporary, as well as both the literary and the visual – and discusses the way they are interconnected:

While many scholars in cultural studies draw distinctions between affect, feeling, and emotion, Cvetkovich does not emphasize the differences between these categories. Rather she uses both affect and feeling “in a generic sense,” where affect is “a category that encompasses affect, emotion, and feeling, and that includes impulses, desires, and feelings that get historically constructed in a range of ways.” She favours the term feeling, though, because it retains “the ambiguity between feelings as embodied sensations and feelings as psychic or cognitive experiences."

Cvetkovich's work is associated with the Public Feelings project, which was begun in 2001. It is not only a feminist project, but also a queer project, though “it is not always announced as such.” The Public Feelings project is interested in the relationship between the public and political and the private and affective. It emphasizes the significance of everyday life and affective experience. One of the cells of the project is Feel Tank Chicago, which came up with the idea of “political depression,” a concept Cvetkovich works with substantially in her book Depression: A Public Feeling (2012). Scholars aside from Cvetkovich whose work is associated with the Public Feelings project include Lauren Berlant, José Esteban Muñoz, Deborah Gould, Rebecca Zorach, Kathleen Stewart, Lisa Duggan, Mary Patten, Janet Staiger, and Ann Reynolds.

Cvetkovich's scholarship engages with various genres and artistic media and is often collaborative. Amongst other topics, she has analyzed and discussed AIDS documentaries and films; butch and femme sexualities and emotions; go-go dancing in relation to sexuality and activism; Alison Bechdel's graphic memoir Fun Home: A Family Tragicomic; and oral interviews with Afghan Americans in relation to 9/11. She has also interviewed artists and photographers such as Allyson Mitchell, Sheila Pepe, Tammy Rae Carland, and Zoe Leonard, engaging with their visual works in her scholarship.

Overview of major works

Mixed Feelings: Feminism, Mass Culture, and Victorian Sensationalism (1992)
Mixed Feelings is based on Cvetkovich's PhD dissertation, which she completed at Cornell University in 1988. It grew out of Cvetkovich's “own mixed feelings about a feminist politics of affect,”  and argues that the effects of affect are not always liberating; rather, affect can “call attention to and obscure complex social relations, and can both inspire and displace social action.” Thus, Cvetkovich's study is a nuanced exploration of affect and politics. In looking at the figure of “the transgressive and/or suffering woman…Cvetkovich traces the construction of affect as both natural and particularly female, and as therefore potentially transgressive and requiring regulation and control.” While Cvetkovich interrogates the way Marxist, feminist, Foucauldian, and psychoanalytic theories have engaged with affect, she also draws upon these approaches in her study. Important to Cvetkovich's argument is the idea that affect should not be viewed as natural, but instead as historical.

In Mixed Feelings, Cvetkovich primarily explores the politics of affect in relation to Victorian sensationalism in the 1860s and 1870s. While she focuses mostly on traditional Victorian sensation novels such as Mary Elizabeth Braddon's Lady Audley's Secret, Wilkie Collins's The Woman in White, and Ellen Wood's East Lynne, she also looks at works that are not typically read as Victorian sensationalism. One chapter looks at George Eliot's Daniel Deronda, where she reads Gwendolen's “dramatic interiority” in relation to the affective power of sensation novels. Another reads Karl Marx's Capital as a sensationalist narrative; while most of the works Cvetkovich studies sensationalize the figure of the middle-class woman, Capital sensationalizes the male worker's body. Although Mixed Feelings focuses primarily on Victorian sensationalism, the book also contains discussions of AIDS activism and the politics of affect in relation to ACT UP.

An Archive of Feelings: Trauma, Sexuality, and Lesbian Public Cultures (2003)
In An Archive of Feelings, Cvetkovich argues for a wider view of trauma that moves beyond those who experience it directly by also taking into consideration its everyday and cultural effects. She states, “I am interested not just in trauma survivors but in those whose experiences circulate in the vicinity of trauma and are marked by it. I want to place moments of extreme trauma alongside moments of everyday emotional distress that are often the only sign that trauma's effects are still being felt.” Furthermore, Cvetkovich not only sexualizes and queers trauma in her book, but she also critiques the pathologization of trauma and argues for a broader understanding of therapy. She breaks the binary “often animated in trauma studies scholarship between acting out (frequently pathologized or designated unhealthy) and working through (often viewed as psychologically positive).” Cvetkovich suggests that the public cultures formed around trauma – trauma cultures – can have therapeutic effects. Collapsing the boundary between privatized emotion and the public and political, “affective life can be seen to pervade public life.”

As its title suggests, Cvetkovich's book is “organized as ‘an archive of feelings,'” and is “an exploration of cultural texts as repositories of feelings and emotions, which are encoded not only in the content of the texts themselves but in the practices that surround their production and reception.” According to Cvetkovich, archives of trauma resemble the archives of gay and lesbian cultures. Not only are ephemera, ephemerality, and memory fundamental to both of these archives, but both also challenge the very concept of the archive. Cvetkovich's sources – her archive – include oral interviews, performances, fiction, poetry, memoirs, photographs, and films. Theoretically, she engages with feminist, critical race, Marxist, and queer theory.

An Archive of Feelings focuses specifically on lesbian and queer trauma. Cvetkovich explores works on butch and femme sexualities in relation to trauma and touch, as well as the complex relationship between incest, lesbianism, and queerness; here, she analyzes performances by Tribe 8 at the Michigan Womyn's Music Festival and works by Margaret Randall and Dorothy Allison. Another section of Cvetkovich's book discusses trauma and queer diaspora in Frances Negrón-Muntaner's film, Brincando el charco; Pratibha Parmar's film, Khush; and Shani Mootoo's novel, Cereus Blooms at Night. Furthermore, An Archive of Feelings contains substantial discussion on AIDS activism, particularly in relation to the organization ACT UP. Drawing upon oral interviews with lesbians who participated in ACT UP – as well as memoirs about caretaking during the AIDS crisis – Cvetkovich seeks to place lesbians back into the history of ACT UP during a time when the organization was “in danger of being remembered as a group of privileged gay white men without a strong political sensibility.” In their testimony, these interviews and memoirs form an archive of feelings, producing a lesbian public culture where affective life and political life coalesce.

Depression: A Public Feeling (2012)
In Depression: A Public Feeling, Cvetkovich looks at “depression as a cultural and social phenomenon rather than a medical disease.” She interrogates the biological model of depression and suggests the significance of both cultural criticism and individual experience as alternative – and perhaps even more important – knowledges of depression. Situating her work in relation to the larger Public Feelings project, she links the private world of feelings to the public world of politics, associating depression with neoliberal capitalism. While Cvetkovich explores how feelings of depression “are produced by social forces,” she also emphasizes the ordinary and everyday aspects of depression and tries to capture “how it feels.” Thus, her work is influenced by Eve Sedgwick's argument for a reparative critical approach. Divided into two sections, Cvetkovich's book is part personal memoir and part critical essay. Drawing together these genres of writing, Cvetkovich's aim is to produce “a cultural analysis that can adequately represent depression as a historical category, a felt experience, and a point of entry into discussions not only about theory and contemporary culture but about how to live.”

The memoir section of Cvetkovich's book, “The Depression Journals,” focuses on the feelings of anxiety and despair surrounding important events in her academic career – finishing her dissertation, landing an academic job, and getting a contract for her first book – as well as how these feelings affected her everyday life (for example, while grocery shopping). Although she notes her experiences with medication and therapists in the hopes of overcoming her depression, she focuses more substantially on the ordinary things that helped her move out of being ‘stuck': swimming, writing, spending time with friends, doing yoga, going to the dentist.

The critical section of Cvetkovich's book provides analysis into some of the topics brought up in “The Depression Journals.” Playing a part in Cvetkovich's memoir, spirituality and religion are also discussed in her critical essay. For Cvetkovich, acedia – “a form of spiritual crisis” that is understood to be an historical precursor to depression – can help provide an alternative to the medical model. Cvetkovich's critical essay also explores the relationship between depression and histories of racism and colonialism, tying “history and depression into the emotional crises that undergird race studies.” Furthermore, looking at the artistic work of Sheila Pepe and Allyson Mitchell, she views “crafting as a model for creative ways of living in a depressive culture.”

Reception and influence
Cvetkovich's work has received attention from both the academic and queer community. Depression: A Public Feeling was reviewed by Elaine Showalter – a well-known feminist critic – as part of her piece in The Chronicle of Higher Education, “Our Age of Anxiety." While Showalter also feels the worries Cvetkovich articulates about academia, she is ultimately critical of her emphasis on depression in higher education. She asks, “But how does focusing on academic anxiety bring light to the discussion in general?” Depression: A Public Feeling, though, has also received much positive attention, being a finalist for the 25th Annual Lambda Literary Awards. Furthermore, the book was interpreted and performed by Dynasty Handbag as part of the event, “Otherwise: Queer Scholarship into Song.” Other works of Cvetkovich's have also been inspirational for artists. Tammy Rae Carland's 2008 photographic project entitled An Archive of Feelings takes its name from Cvetkovich's book by the same name.

An Archive of Feelings is perhaps Cvetkovich's most influential work, and has been taken up in several academic fields. These include sexuality studies, queer theory, American Studies, and women and gender studies. For example, in Feeling Backward: Loss and the Politics of Queer History (2007), Heather Love relates her work to Cvetkovich's, noting that “An Archive of Feelings, makes backward feelings central.” Mel Y. Chen also draws from “the affective politics of Ann Cvetkovich's important work on lesbian cultures of trauma” in their work on animacies. Furthermore, Jack Halberstam's “interest in a queer archive” is influenced by “Cvetkovich's concept of archive of feelings, a term central for Halberstam.” Similar to Cvetkovich, Halberstam sees an archive as “not simply a repository” but “also a theory of cultural relevance, a construction of collective memory, and a complex record of queer activity.”

While Cvetkovich's work has been influential, it has also received some criticism. Perhaps the most well-known of these critiques occurs in Eve Sedgwick and Adam Frank's article, “Shame in the Cybernetic Fold: Reading Silvan Tomkins.” Speaking of Cvetkovich's engagement with affect in her first book, Mixed Feelings, they state:

Sedgwick and Frank's critique of Cvetkovich's first book, however, is merely used as a way to challenge the “hygiene of…antiessentialism” in poststructuralist theory. In a footnote, they state that there are numerous other theorists (including Sedgwick herself) that are more steeped in the “routines of theory” of which they accuse Cvetkovich, and who are “more directly responsible for their popularization.” However, they chose to critique Cvetkovich's book because using a new scholar's work would allow them to more “effectively defamiliarize[]” the “critical practices” they are challenging.

Selected publications
 “Photographing Objects as Queer Archival Practice,” in Feeling Photography. Ed. Elspeth Brown and Thy Phu. Durham: Duke UP, 2014. 273-296.
 “The Craft of Conversation: Oral History and Lesbian Feminist Art Practice,” in Oral History in the Visual Arts. Ed. Linda Sandino and Matthew Partington. New York: Bloomsbury, 2013. 125-34.
 Depression: A Public Feeling. Durham: Duke UP, 2012. 
 “Depression is Ordinary: Public Feelings and Saidiya Hartman's Lose Your Mother.” Feminist Theory 13.2 (2012): 131-46.
 “Can the Diaspora Speak? Afghan Americans and the 9/11 Oral History Archive.” Radical History Review 111 (2011): 90-100.
 “Photographing Objects: Art as Queer Archival Practice,” in Lost and Found: Queerying the Archive. Ed. Mathias Danbolt, Jane Rowley, and Louise Wolthers. Copenhagen: Nikolaj Copenhagen Contemporary Art Center, 2009. 49-65.
 “Drawing the Archive in Alison Bechdel's Fun Home.” Women's Studies Quarterly 36.1-2 (2008): 111-28. 
 “Public Feelings.” The South Atlantic Quarterly 106.3 (2007): 459-68. 
 An Archive of Feelings: Trauma, Sexuality, and Lesbian Public Cultures. Durham: Duke UP, 2003. 
 “In the Archives of Lesbian Feeling: Documentary and Popular Culture.” Camera Obscura 17.1 (2002): 107-47. 
 “White Boots and Combat Boots: My Life as a Lesbian Go-Go Dancer,” in Dancing Desires: Choreographing Sexualities On & Off the Stage. Ed. Jane C. Desmond. Madison: University of Wisconsin Press, 2001. 315-48.
 “Histories of Mass Culture: From Literary to Visual Culture.” Victorian Literature and Culture 27.2 (1999): 495-99. 
 “Untouchability and Vulnerability: Stone Butchness as Emotional Style,” in Butch/Femme: Inside Lesbian Gender. Ed. Sally R. Munt. London: Cassell, 1998. 159-69.
  “Video, AIDS, and Activism,” in Art, Activism, and Oppositionality: Essays from Afterimage. Ed. Grant H. Kester. Durham: Duke UP, 1998. 182-98. 
 “Sexual Trauma/Queer Memory: Incest, Lesbianism, and Therapeutic Culture.” GLQ 2.4 (1995): 351-77. 
 “The Powers of Seeing and Being Seen: Truth or Dare and Paris is Burning,” in Film Theory Goes to the Movies. Ed. Jim Collins. New York: Routledge, 1993. 155-69. 
 Mixed Feelings: Feminism, Mass Culture, and Victorian Sensationalism. New Jersey: Rutgers UP, 1992. 
 “Postmodern Vertigo: The Sexual Politics of Allusion in De Palma's Body Double,” in Hitchcock's Rereleased Films: From Rope to Vertigo. Ed. Walter Raubicheck and Walter Srebnick. Detroit: Wayne State UP, 1991. 147-62. 
 “Ghostlier Determinations: The Economy of Sensation and ‘The Woman in White.'” Novel: A Forum on Fiction 23.1 (1989): 24-43.

Roundtable discussions and interviews
 Tammy Rae Carland and Ann Cvetkovich, “Sharing and Archive of Feelings: A Conversation.” Art Journal 72.2 (2013): 70-77. 
 “Roundtable: Gender and September 11.” Signs 28.1 (2002): 433-79.
 Susan Lurie, Ann Cvetkovich, Jane Gallop, Tania Modleski, et al. “Roundtable: Restoring Feminist Politics to Poststructuralist Critique.” Feminist Studies 27.3 (2001): 679-707. 
 Ann Cvetkovich and Selena Wahng, “Don't Stop the Music: Roundtable Discussion with Workers from the Michigan Womyn's Music Festival.” GLQ 7.1 (2000): 131-51.

References

External links 
 Ann Cvetkovich's website
 Cvetkovich's Faculty Biography from the University of Texas at Austin
 Fembot Interview with Ann Cvetkovich on Depression: A Public Feeling
 Interview with Ann Cvetkovich on No More Potlucks

1957 births
Living people
American feminist writers
American literary historians
Cornell University alumni
LGBT studies academics
Reed College alumni
University of Texas at Austin faculty
American women historians
Women literary historians
21st-century American women